Souris may refer to:

Places
 Souris, Manitoba, Canada
 Souris, Prince Edward Island, Canada
 Souris, North Dakota, United States
 Souris Island, Seychelles
 Souris River, in Canada and the United States

Electoral districts 
 Souris (electoral district), a federal electoral district in Manitoba
 Souris (Saskatchewan electoral district), a provincial electoral district

People
 André Souris (1899–1970), Belgian composer
 George Souris (born 1949), Australian politician
 Léo Souris (1911–1990), Belgian composer
 Theodore Souris (1925–2002), American jurist

Other uses 
 RCAF Station Souris, a Second World War British Commonwealth Air Training Plan station near Souris, Manitoba